Agustín González Martínez (24 March 1930 in Linares – 16 January 2005 in Madrid) was a Spanish actor who appeared in more than 180 films, including El nido (1980), by Jaime de Armiñan; Volver a empezar (1981), by José Luis Garci; La colmena (1982), by Mario Camús; Dos mejor que uno (1984), by Ángel Llorente and Las bicicletas son para el verano (1984), by Fernando Fernán Gómez.

Biography 
He was brother of Manuel González, one of the members of Los Brincos.

He started several university studies in Engineering and Philosophy and Literature, but he didn't finish. He started his career as an actor in the Teatro Español Universitario, where he stayed several years during his stage as a student. He grew as one of the most important Spanish actors thanks to his theatre performances and cinema directors such as  Carlos Saura, Juan Antonio Bardem, Mario Camus or Fernando Fernán Gómez. He worked in 140 movies, theatre plays and TV series. From 1954 to 1986, he had a relationship with the actress María Luisa Ponte, 12 years older than he was, but they never got married. His last film was Tiovivo 1950, by José Luis Garci. His last theatre play was Tres hombres y un destino, in Madrid, but he had to be replaced because of his sickness. He died on 16 January 2005 of pneumonia in the clinic La Zarzuela, in Madrid, at aged 74.

Prizes 
 Medalla de Oro de Bellas Artes, 1983.
 Mejor actor por Las Bicicletas son para el verano, 1984.
 Premio Calabuch for La marrana.
 Premio Festival de Cine de Peñíscola for Belle Époque.
 Golden Medalla al Mérito en el Trabajo by the Spanish Government in 2004.

Filmography 
In his filmography, he appears in humorous and dramatic films and he has been considered one of the best Spanish actors in supporting roles

Film

Caricias
La Ley de la frontera
Todos a la cárcel
Aquí, el que no corre... vuela
Después del sueño
Gran sol
Gary Cooper, que estás en los cielos
A la luz de la luna, by González Sinde
Felices Pascuas, by Juan Antonio Bardem, 1954
Mi calle, by Edgar Neville, 1960
Plácido, by Luis García Berlanga, 1961
The Mustard Grain (1962)
The Fair of the Dove (1963)
La becerrada (1963)
De cuerpo presente, by Antonio Eceiza, 1965
That Man in Istanbul, 1965
The Regent's Wife (1975)
La escopeta nacional, by Berlanga, 1978
Companys, procés a Catalunya (1979)
Patrimonio nacional, by Berlanga, 1980
El nido, by Jaime de Armiñán, 1980
Gary Cooper, Who Art in Heaven (1980)
Volver a empezar, by José Luis Garci, 1981
Nacional III, by Berlanga, 1982
La colmena, by Mario Camús, 1982
Las bicicletas son para el verano, written by Fernando Fernán Gómez, 1983
Hay que deshacer la casa (1983)
Dos mejor que uno, by Ángel Llorente, 1984
La vaquilla, 1984
Crimen en familia, 1985
La corte de Faraón, by José Luis García Sánchez
Stico, 1985
Redondela, by Pedro Costa, 1986
Mambrú se fue a la guerra (1986)
El hermano bastardo de Dios (1986)
Moros y cristianos (1987)
La marrana, by José Luis Cuerda
Belle Époque (1992), second Academy Award in Spanish history, by Fernando Trueba
Los peores años de nuestra vida, by Emilio Martínez Lázaro
Así en el Cielo como en la Tierra (1995, by José Luis Cuerda)
El abuelo (1998, by José Luis Garci)
Historia de un beso by José Luis Garci
Tiovivo c. 1950, by José Luis Garci

TV series
Cervantes (1981) - Luis de Góngora (uncredited)
Escalera exterior, escalera interior (1986) - Don Horacio
Los ladrones van a la oficina (1993)
A las once en casa (1998-1999) - Don Ramón
Cuéntame cómo pasó (2002) - Teodoro
La vida de Rita (2003) - Fernando
7 vidas (2003) - Emilio Freire
Hospital Central (2004) - Damián Corcuera

References

External links

1930 births
2005 deaths
Spanish male stage actors
Spanish male film actors
Spanish male telenovela actors
Male actors from Madrid
Deaths from pneumonia in Spain